Frogner Station is a railway station at Frogner in Akershus, Norway on the Trunk Line. The station was opened in 1854 as part of the Trunk Line. It is served by twice-hourly service R13 by Vy.

External links
<

Railway stations on the Trunk Line
Railway stations in Sørum
Railway stations opened in 1854
1854 establishments in Norway